Torrenova is a surface station of Line C of the Rome Metro. It is located in Via Casilina, serving the Roman districts of Torre Angela, Tor Vergata and Giardinetti. It's the only above-ground stop of Line C which retained the original architecture of the historic train station on the Rome–Pantano railway line. The old train station was temporarily closed down in 2008 for restoration and modernisation works; it re-opened on 9 November 2014 as part of the new Metro line.

External links

Rome Metro Line C stations
Railway stations opened in 2014
2014 establishments in Italy
Railway stations in Italy opened in the 21st century